Teresa is a Mexican telenovela produced by Televisa and originally transmitted by Telesistema Mexicano.

Cast 
 Maricruz Olivier as Teresa Martínez
 Aldo Monti as Mario
 Antonio Bravo as Héctor
 Luis Beristáin as José Antonio
 Beatriz Aguirre as Luisa
 Graciela Doring as Aurora
 Alicia Montoya as Josefina
 José Luis Jiménez as Papá de Teresa
 Maruja Grifell as Madrina de Teresa
 Fanny Schiller as Eulalia
 Antonio Raxel as Manuel
 Angelines Fernández as Esmeralda
 Enrique Cuoto
 Guillermo Rivas

References

External links 

Mexican telenovelas
Televisa telenovelas
1959 telenovelas
1959 Mexican television series debuts
1959 Mexican television series endings
Spanish-language telenovelas